Alfred William Newman (April 5, 1834January 11, 1898) was an American lawyer, judge, and politician in Wisconsin.  He was a justice of the Wisconsin Supreme Court for the last four years of his life, after fifteen years as a Wisconsin Circuit Court Judge.  Earlier in his career he served in the Wisconsin State Senate and Wisconsin State Assembly.

Biography

Born in Durham, New York, Newman graduated from Hamilton College in 1857. After studying law he was admitted to the New York Bar. In 1858, he moved to Trempealeau County, Wisconsin, where he was elected judge and then district attorney. In 1863, Newman served in the Wisconsin State Assembly and in 1868–1869, served in the Wisconsin State Senate. In 1876, Newman was elected judge of the Wisconsin Circuit Court for the newly created 13th Circuit.  The next year, however, the circuits were redrawn and he became Judge of the 6th Circuit. He remained judge of the 6th Circuit until 1894, when he began his term on the Wisconsin Supreme Court, where he served until his death.

Electoral history

| colspan="6" style="text-align:center;background-color: #e9e9e9;"| General Election, April 7, 1893

Notes

People from Durham, New York
People from Trempealeau County, Wisconsin
Hamilton College (New York) alumni
Members of the Wisconsin State Assembly
Wisconsin state senators
Wisconsin state court judges
Justices of the Wisconsin Supreme Court
1834 births
1898 deaths
19th-century American politicians
19th-century American judges